The 2007 Women's Hockey Setanta Sports Trophy was the first edition of the Setanta Sports Trophy, a women's field hockey tournament. It was held in Dublin, Ireland, from June 13 to 17, 2007, and featured four of the top nations in women's field hockey.

The tournament was held simultaneously with the men's competition.

Competition format
The tournament featured the national teams of Germany, Scotland, South Africa, and the hosts, Ireland, competing in a round-robin format, with each team playing each other once. Three points were awarded for a win, one for a draw, and none for a loss.

Officials
The following umpires were appointed by the International Hockey Federation to officiate the tournament:

 Maggie Conacher (SCO)
 Corrine Cornelius (RSA)
 Carol Metchette (IRE)
 Petra Müller (GER)
 Dino Willox (WAL)

Results
All times are local (Irish Standard Time).

Preliminary round

Fixtures

Classification round

Third and fourth place

Final

Statistics

Final standings

Goalscorers

References

2007 in women's field hockey
hockey
International women's field hockey competitions hosted by Ireland
Sport in Dublin (city)
June 2007 sports events in Europe